The third series of I'm a Celebrity...Get Me Out of Here! began on 26 January 2004 and ended on 9 February 2004. The programme ran for 15 days (16 days if counting the morning the finalists exited) and was sponsored by First Choice Holidays. The series was won by Kerry Katona (McFadden at the time).

This series saw contestants Peter Andre and Katie Price (named Jordan) start a high-profile relationship which would feature in tabloids and magazines for the five years they were together. Price returned to the jungle for a second time in 2009.

Celebrities
10 celebrities participated in the series:

Results and elimination

 Indicates that the celebrity received the fewest votes and was immediately eliminated (no bottom two)
 Indicates that the celebrity was in the bottom two in the public vote

Bushtucker Trials
The contestants take part in daily trials to earn food

 The public vote for who they want to face the trial
 The contestants decide who does which trial
 The trial is compulsory and neither the public nor celebrities decide who take part

Notes
 This was the first bushtucker trial ever to be screened live on television.
 Kerry refused to participate.
 This was a reworking of Kerry's refused trial.

Star count

Ratings 
Ratings from BARB.

References

2004 British television seasons
03